Hanceville  may refer to:

Hanceville, Alabama
Hanceville, British Columbia